Samantha "Sam" Loggin (born 1977) is an English actress. She was born in Northamptonshire, UK. Her noteworthy performances include the roles of Lucy in Lucy Sullivan Is Getting Married and Anna in Girls in Love.

Filmography

References

External links
 

English television actresses
1977 births
Living people